Phaungkaza Maung Maung (15 September 1763 – 11 February 1782) was the fifth king of the Konbaung Dynasty of Burma, whose reign lasted six days. Maung Maung, the eldest son of Naungdawgyi, the second king of the Konbaung Dynasty, and Chief queen Shin Hpo U. He was granted the appenage of Phaungga in fief. On 5 February 1782, the 18-year-old Prince of Phaungka pretended to be a king and entered the palace and seized the throne while his cousin King Singu pilgrimaging to Anyar Thiha Taw Pagoda. Phaungkaza Maung Maung was the shortest lived king among the Konbaung Kings.

His uncle Prince of Badon (later King Bodawpaya) quickly came to palace and deposed him on 11 February 1782. Maung Maung and his chief queen were drowned to death on the same day.

Family
He had two queens, chief queen was Shin Bai Toke, daughter of U Shun, who was brother of the barn minister U Tun. She gave birth to a son who was named Maung Yike who rebelled against Bodawpaya in 1805, based in Kyun Hla Village. The second queen was Me Bwar, daughter of Min Khe Paung, who was a daughter of King Mahadhammaraza Dipadi, the last king of Toungoo dynasty of Burma. She did not bear any issue.

Notes

References

Bibliography
 

Konbaung dynasty
1763 births
1782 deaths
18th-century Burmese monarchs